Ecodesk is a cloud based data platform used by corporate businesses to track, monitor and report their ESG data.

Data relating to environmental, social and governance subject areas is input to the platform for use in reporting to stakeholders via standards such as CDP, GRI, GHG Protocol or for use by businesses to engage stakeholders in their sustainability achievements. 

Ecodesk was founded by the successful entrepreneur Robert Clarke in Australia in 2007, and migrated to the UK in 2010.  In 2018, Ecodesk received the highly acclaimed ISAR Honours Award from UNCTAD in recognition of its work building a digital platform for mapping the non-financial reporting landscape in conjunction with WBCSD's Redefining Values programme, CDSB and with support from the Gordon and Betty Moore Foundation.

Services 
Ecodesk enables organisations to improve the management and performance of their supply chain and to reduce their inherent risk through the collection and aggregation of ESG data presented. Ecodesk is not a ratings or rankings provider but does provide flexible supplier scorecard solutions via what is termed an SAQ (self-assessment questionnaire). Like most software providers in the market it displays data to enterprise users in the form of dashboards and digital reporting functions.

The SaaS platform is supported by a managed service aspect which helps suppliers with their data submission and understanding their non-financial reporting obligations. The platform is free-to-use for entities responding to a data request and levies a charge for enterprise users to connect with their extended supply chains. This unique approach of "free data" entry and simple communication differentiates it from its competitors and encourages co-operation and data input at all levels.

See also 
 Carbon Disclosure Project
 Supply chain management
 Conflict minerals
 Open data

References

External links 
 Ecodesk homepage
 Open data isn't sexy, but it is very important
 Ecodesk Adds Top Talent As Part Of Global Expansion Plan
 Who uses open data?
 Leading businesses address daunting scope 3 reporting
 Can energy and carbon reporting rules affect the way companies do business?
 Leading firms join Ecodesk to improve supply chain efficiency
 Can reporting sustainability data make financial institutions more profitable?
 Multinationals join supply chain reporting project
 Environmental executive moves ecodesk
 Ecodesk aims to improve supply chain emissions reporting
 Packaging giants sign up to carbon emissions measuring scheme
 Report or be damned why the industry is opening up to carbon
 FM firms share data to drive sustainability
 Leading businesses join sustainability reporting campaign
 Guide to procurement analytics
 Supply chains hold key to reducing energy and saving costs

Sustainability organizations
Organisations based in Bath, Somerset